The Opener of the Way is a collection of fantasy and horror short stories by American writer Robert Bloch. It was released in 1945 and was the author's first book.  It was published by Arkham House in an edition of 2,065 copies. A British hardcover was issued by Neville Spearman in 1974, with Panther Books issuing a two-volume paperback reprint in 1976. An Italian translation, with the stories reordered, appeared in 1991. The collection was never reprinted in the United States, but its contents (aside from Bloch's introduction) were included in the 1994 omnibus The Early Fears.

Most of the stories had appeared in the magazine Weird Tales in the 1930s and 1940s.

Contents

The Opener of the Way contains the following tales:

 "By Way of Introduction"
 "The Cloak"
 "Beetles"
 "The Fiddler's Fee"
 "The Mannikin"
 "The Strange Flight of Richard Clayton"
 "Yours Truly, Jack the Ripper"
 "The Seal of the Satyr"
 "The Dark Demon"
 "The Faceless God"
 "The House of the Hatchet"
 "The Opener of the Way"
 "Return to the Sabbath"
 "The Mandarin's Canaries"
 "Waxworks"
 "The Feast in the Abbey"
 "Slave of the Flames"
 "The Shambler from the Stars"
 "Mother of Serpents"
 "The Secret of Sebek"
 "The Eyes of the Mummy"
 "One Way to Mars"

Critical reception
Stephen King listed The Opener of the Way as one of Arkham House's "most important works". Stephen Jones and Kim Newman included the collection in Horror: Another 100 Best Books, with Joel Lang noting that it demonstrated Bloch's "meteoric development from faux-Gothic pastiche to sour, elliptical portraits of urban damnation". Don D'Ammassa stated that "Although some of the stories are crude by [Bloch's] later standards, there is a raw power to many of them that has ensured their continued popularity".

Trivia

The creators of the game Half-Life 2 reference Bloch's work: the central villain, Dr. Wallace Breen refers to the player's character, Gordon Freeman in a televised speech saying "And yet, unsophisticated minds continue to imbue him with romantic power, giving him such dangerous poetic labels as 'the one free man, the opener of the way.'"

The Dungeons and Dragons Role-playing game features (in the third Monster Manual) a creature called Allabar, Opener of the Way.

References

1945 short story collections
Horror short story collections
Fantasy short story collections
Short story collections by Robert Bloch
Arkham House books